Gordonia sihwensis is a Gram-positive and nitrate-reducing bacterium from the genus of Gordonia which has been isolated from an autotrophic denitrification reactor in Sihwa in Korea.

References

Further reading 
 

Mycobacteriales
Bacteria described in 2003